Andrea Vergani (born 15 June 1997) is an Italian swimmer. He competed in the men's 50 metre freestyle event at the 2018 European Aquatics Championships, winning the bronze medal.

References

External links
 

1997 births
Living people
Italian male freestyle swimmers
European Aquatics Championships medalists in swimming
European Championships (multi-sport event) bronze medalists
Swimmers from Milan
Swimmers at the 2015 European Games
European Games competitors for Italy
Swimmers at the 2018 Mediterranean Games
Mediterranean Games competitors for Italy